This is a list of prime ministers of Mauritania since the formation of the post of Prime Minister of Mauritania in 1960 to the present day.

A total of sixteen people have served as Prime Minister of Mauritania (not counting one Acting Prime Minister). Additionally, three persons, Maaouya Ould Sid'Ahmed Taya, Sidi Mohamed Ould Boubacar and Cheikh El Avia Ould Mohamed Khouna, have served on two non-consecutive occasions.

The current Prime Minister of Mauritania is Mohamed Ould Bilal, since 6 August 2020.

Key
Political parties

Other factions

Status

List of officeholders

Timeline

See also
 Politics of Mauritania 
 List of heads of state of Mauritania
 List of colonial governors of Mauritania

Notes

References

External links
 World Statesmen – Mauritania

Mauritania
 
Government of Mauritania
Political history of Mauritania
Mauritania politics-related lists
Mauritania history-related lists
1960 establishments in Africa